George Spencer Hooker (30 May 1836 – 1877) was an English cricketer.  Hooker's batting and bowling styles are unknown.  He was born at East Grinstead, Sussex.

Hodson made his first-class debut for Sussex against the Marylebone Cricket Club in 1857.  He made three further first-class appearances for the county, the last of which came against Kent in 1859.  In his four first-class matches for Sussex, he took 15 wickets at an average of 9.66, with best figures of 5/32.  These figures came on debut against the Marylebone Cricket Club, in which he took 10 of his 15 career wickets.  He 5/32 in the Marylebone Cricket Club's first-innings, while in their second-innings he took 5/33, finishing with match figures of 10/65.  With the bat, he scored a total of 35 runs at a batting average of 11.66, with a high score of 17.

He died at Tunbridge Wells, Kent at some point in 1877.

References

External links
George Hooker at ESPNcricinfo
George Hooker at CricketArchive

1836 births
1877 deaths
People from East Grinstead
English cricketers
Sussex cricketers